Lough Kinale is a freshwater lake in the north midlands of Ireland. It is located on the borders of Counties Longford, Westmeath and Cavan. Lough Kinale forms part of the River Inny. The lake's inflow is from Lough Sheelin and the outflow is to Lough Derravaragh. The neighbouring (but much smaller) Derragh Lough is also connected by a river to Lough Kinale.

Geography
The majority of the lake is in County Longford. It is situated downstream from Lough Sheelin in the upper part of the catchment area of the River Inny, a main tributary of the River Shannon. A smaller lake, Lough Derragh, is linked to the outflow of the Inny River and Lough Kinale. There are two parts, almost separated by a central swampy area. The margins of the lake have several reed beds, interspersed with calcium-rich marsh dominated by small sedges. The surrounding land has boggy areas, some of which have been converted to coniferous plantations. The water quality is variable, sometimes suffering from run-off of nutrients from agricultural land. At one time the lake was a trout fishery.

Natural history
Lough Kinale is a noted coarse fishing destination with fish species including pike.

Lough Kinale is part of the Lough Kinale and Derragh Lough Special Protected Area (SPA). This is an important site for overwintering wildfowl, especially mute swan, pochard and tufted duck. The Eurasian coot is found here as well as smaller numbers of great crested grebe, little grebe and mallard. The birds fly back and forth between this lake and the much larger Lough Sheelin.

See also
List of loughs in Ireland

References

Kinale
Kinale
Kinale